Xenomerius is a genus of beetles in the family Buprestidae, containing the following species:

 Xenomerius baguenai (Cobos, 1959)
 Xenomerius bicolor Pochon, 1972
 Xenomerius ceballosi (Cobos, 1959)
 Xenomerius clermonti Obenberger, 1924
 Xenomerius cribratus (Waterhouse, 1887)
 Xenomerius guineae Kalashian, 1996
 Xenomerius laevipennis (Kerremans, 1892)
 Xenomerius pareumeroides Obenberger, 1924
 Xenomerius umtali Bellamy, 1990

References

Buprestidae genera